Y Foel Goch is a mountain in Snowdonia, north-west Wales, and is a sister peak along with Gallt yr Ogof to Glyder Fach. Between Glyder Fach and its summit lies Llyn Caseg-fraith, a popular lake for photographing Tryfan and its reflection.

The summit is grassy with a few small rock outcrops and is marked with a small cairn. The views are limited to the bulky neighbours of Moel Siabod, Tryfan and Glyder Fach. The ridge continues eastwards to Gallt yr Ogof.

References

External links 
 www.geograph.co.uk : photos of Gallt yr Ogof and surrounding area

Capel Curig
Mountains and hills of Conwy County Borough
Mountains and hills of Snowdonia
Hewitts of Wales
Nuttalls